The Manche Chʼol were a former Chʼol-speaking Maya people inhabiting the extreme south of what is now the Petén Department of modern Guatemala, the area around Lake Izabal (also known as the Golfo Dulce), and southern Belize. The Manche Chʼol took the name Manche from the name of their main settlement. They were the last group of eastern Cholan-speakers to remain independent and ethnically distinct. It is likely that they were descended from the inhabitants of Classic period (c. 250-900 AD) Maya cities in the southeastern Maya region, such as Nim Li Punit, Copán and Quiriguá.

The first Spanish contact with the Manche Chʼol was in 1525, when an expedition led by Hernán Cortés crossed their territory. From the early 17th century onwards, Dominican friars attempted to concentrate the Manche into mission towns and convert them to Christianity. These attempts alarmed their warlike Itza neighbours to the northwest, who attacked the mission towns and fomented rebellion among the Manche. The Manche Chʼol in the mission towns were badly affected by disease, which also encouraged them to flee the towns.

In the late 17th century, Franciscan missionaries argued that further attempts at peaceful pacification of the Chʼol were useless and argued for armed intervention against the Manche Chʼol and their Lakandon Chʼol neighbours. The Manche were forcibly relocated in the Guatemalan Highlands, where they did not prosper. By 1770, most of the Manche Chʼol were extinct. The few survivors were soon absorbed into the surrounding Qʼeqchʼi Maya population.

Language
Spanish colonial documents refer to the inhabitants of a broad swathe of territory as Chols or Cholans; this territory extended from the Laguna de Términos through the Lacandon Jungle across the foothills of the Sierra de los Cuchumatanes eastwards to southern Belize. A number of distinct Chol- or Cholan-speaking groups inhabited this area; the Manche Chʼol were just one of these groups and spoke the now extinct Chʼoltiʼ language. Chʼoltiʼ was descended from the Classic Maya language used in hieroglyphic texts. Chʼoltiʼ was very closely related to the Chʼol, Cholan and Chʼortiʼ languages. The Chʼoltiʼ language is evidenced from a single document written in the late 17th century in the Manche Chʼol territory; it has been held in the library of the American Philosophical Society since the 19th century. The document is the Arte y vocabulario de la lengua Cholti, 1695 by Spanish friar Francisco Morán, with the catalogue number Mss.497.4.M79. It was compiled in the Manche village San Lucas Tzalac. The term manche, is derived from the elements men, meaning "artisan", and che, meaning either "tribe" or "tree"; it was the name of a large Manche Chʼol settlement.

Territory

The Manche Chʼol inhabited the southern Petén Basin, southern Belize, and the area around Lake Izabal. Their territory consisted of tropical rainforest upon a low-lying limestone plain, crossed by fast-flowing rivers. It also featured small areas of savannah and extensive swamps. The Manche Chʼol occupied a frontier region between the jurisdictions of the Spanish colonial authorities in Yucatán and Guatemala. The Manche Chʼol had frequent contact with the inhabitants of Cahabón, to the southwest, which continued after Cahabón was incorporated into the Spanish Empire. The Manche Chʼol were bordered to the north by the Mopan Maya and to the west by the Acala Maya, who were probably another Chʼol-speaking group. Further west were the Lakandon Chʼol, occupying land around the tributaries of the upper Usumacinta River. To the northwest of the Manche Chʼol were the Itza, with their territory centered upon their island capital of Nojpetén, upon Lake Petén Itzá. To the east, the Manche Chʼol bordered the Caribbean Sea, and in the 17th century Dominican friar Joseph Delgado mentioned that the Manche Chʼol had settlements scattered along the Caribbean coast almost as far north as Bacalar, now within the borders of Quintana Roo state in southeastern Mexico. Settlements on the Caribbean coast in the early 17th century included Yaxhal, Paliac, Campin and Tzoite. There were further towns in the Cancuén River drainage, including Manche (renamed San Miguel Manché by the Spanish), Chocahau, Yaxha (colonial San Pablo Yaxhá) and Yol (colonial Santo Domingo Yol). The closest Manche town to colonial Verapaz was Tzalac (referred to as San Lucas Salac by the Spanish),  from Cahabón. This was a large Manche settlement on the Sarstoon River, close to the Gracias a Díos rapids.

Society
Men either went naked or wore cloths covering their lower regions; women wore fine skirts woven from cotton, and some used a fine white cloth to cover their head and chest. The Manche Chʼol, based on their distinctive attire, in particular their turban-style headdresses, were probably descended from the Classic period inhabitants of the region; similar headdresses were illustrated in Classic Maya art from Nim Li Punit and such headdresses were restricted to the southeastern Maya lowlands and were used at cities such as Copán, Quiriguá, and their satellites. Manche Chʼol men grew their hair long; they were forced to cut it short upon their evangelisation and this caused much ill-feeling. 

The Manche Chʼol practised polygamy; converted Manche men were forced to give up all their wives except one. This was said to have caused such distress among some Manche men relocated to the Guatemalan Highlands that they were reported to have died. 

The Manche Chʼol subsisted upon a maize-based diet; maize was mostly consumed in liquid form, such as in posole, and was probably eaten as tamales. The Manche diet also included beans, chilli, sweet potato and turkey. Plantain and sugar cane were introduced to the Manche after European contact.

The Manche Chʼol used a variation of the Maya calendar, using a 365-day year divided into eighteen 20-day "months" and ending with a 5-day unlucky period.  They worshipped a number of nature-based Maya deities, particularly gods of mountains and dangerous mountain passes, gods of rivers and whirlpools, and of crossroads. One named god was Escurruchan or Xcarruchan, a mountain god that was said to inhabit a mountain top close to the Gracias a Díos waterfall on the Sarstoon River. On top of the mountain was a well-kept plaza with a fire that was kept permanently lit so travellers could make offerings of copal incense. Another mountain god was called Vatanchu, which translates as "straight god", who inhabited a peak on the road from Chulul to Manche. The Manche Chʼol god of death and the underworld was called Cizin. In 1635 Martín Tovilla, governor of Verapaz, related that the principal gods of the Manche were called Canam, Man, and Chuemexchel. He reported that Manche priests dressed in finely painted vestments fashioned from tree bark. Priests were served during rituals by young women wearing feathers, garlands and necklaces. The Manche offered sacrifices to their deities that included copal incense, turkeys and human blood, both from personal bloodletting and from human sacrifice.

Organisation and commerce

The Manche Chʼol lacked a complex political organisation, and possessed no large towns within their territory. Their largest settlement was Manche itself, with about one hundred multi-family houses. Manche was also the name of the principal lineage at Manche and this lineage was the origin of the populations of the other Manche Chʼol towns. Nito was another principal settlement, and an important port for maritime trade that maintained strong links with places as far away as the province of Acalan in what is now southern Campeche in Mexico. Otherwise, the Manche Chʼol lived in generally small settlements governed by one or more chieftains; they were less politically complex than their Lakandon and Itza neighbours, and were not ruled by a principal king or chieftain. They grew relatively little maize, rather concentrating their agricultural production upon the prestige crops of cacao, annatto and vanilla. All the main settlements, both on the coast and inland, were noted for their prodigious cacao and annatto plantations.

The Manche Chʼol were integrated into a regional trade network that included their Itza and Lakandon Chʼol neighbours, and involved the exchange of Manche produce such as cacao, annatto and vanilla for salt, the only Maya source of which was controlled by the Itza after the Spanish conquest of the province of Acalan. This trade monopoly was maintained by force on the part of the Itza, who vigorously ensured that the Manche Chʼol remained subservient to them. After the Manche towns on the coast of Belize fell under Spanish control in the 16th century, they continued to have close links with the independent inland Manche settlements. Trade continued and intermarriage was common. The towns in the Cancuén River drainage traded via land and riverine routes with both the independent Itza (notably with Nojpetén) and with colonial Verapaz (principally with Cobán and Cahabón).

There were two main trade routes used by the Manche Chʼol; the first went north along the Mopan River to Chacchilan, then overland to Nojpetén. The second followed the Cancuén River to Yol, and there joined the Pasión River northwards, leaving the river when it turned west and continuing overland to Nojpetén. Xocmo, on the Sacapulas River, was a trading port where the Manche and Lakandon Chʼols met to trade cacao and annatto. Xocmo had a major fair, still taking place as late as 1676, where traders arrived from various colonial and independent settlements; these included Nojpetén and the towns of Cobán, San Agustín Lanquín and Sacapulas in colonial Verapaz. The Chols traded cacao and annatto into the encomienda towns of Verapaz in exchange for metal tools (particularly axes and machetes) and salt. Other products traded to the Manche by the Qʼeqchiʼ of colonial Verapaz included cotton textiles and quetzal feathers. The Qʼeqchiʼ used this trade to supply products demanded by their Spanish overlords under the repartimiento system. The Manche produced a number of products for trade, manufactured from resources in the southern Maya Mountains of Belize; these included blowguns, bows and arrows, finely sculpted greenstone axes, hammocks, manos and metates, pottery, and cane, all of which were traded across the southern Maya region.

Spanish contact
Conquistador Hernán Cortés passed through Manche Chʼol territory in 1525, and described it as sparsely populated. In the 16th century, the coastal towns of Campin and Tzoite were given in encomienda to Hernando Sánchez de Aguilar; they fell within the jurisdiction of colonial Bacalar, on the Yucatán coast near Chetumal. Although some Manche Chʼols visited the Dominican friars in Cobán, Verapaz, in 1564, the central Manche were not contacted by the Spanish again until 1603, when Dominican missionaries first attempted to evangelise them, and started to gather the scattered inhabitants into towns. In the second half of the 16th century, the still-independent Manche Chʼol became a refuge for Christianised Maya living under Spanish domination in Verapaz, who wished to escape and live as apostates among them and their Lakandon Chʼol neighbours. In 1596, Dominican friar Juan Esguerra reported seeing eleven Manche traders in Cahabón; he claimed that the Manche Chʼol were frequent visitors to the town. In 1600 the regular presence of Manche Chʼol traders in Cahabón was again reported, and they were said to arrive in greater numbers for the town's festivities in honour of its patron saint. Friar Esguerra complained in 1605 of the great number of Christianised Qʼeqchiʼ Maya of Cahabón that were fleeing the town to live as apostates among the Manche Chʼol.

By 1606 the missionaries had concentrated many Manche Chʼols in nine new mission towns, and had started to penetrate the territory of the neighbouring Mopan Maya, who were on the borders of the fiercely independent Itza of central Petén. By 1628 the Dominicans were tending to 6,000 Maya in the part of Manche Chʼol territory that they had gained access to. This figure included some apostate refugees from Spanish-controlled Cahabón. Estimates of the total Manche Chʼol population in the mid-17th century vary from 10,000 to 30,000, with prominent 20th-century Mayanist J. Eric S. Thompson preferring the lower figure as opposed to the high-end estimates by 17th-century chroniclers. The Dominican penetration of Mopan territory alarmed the Itza, who started to harass the Manche Chʼol, driving them away from the mission towns.

In spite of the Dominicans' successes among the Manche in the early 17th century, they suffered a serious setback in the early 1630s when the Itza and Mopan attacked the Manche Chʼol mission towns, driving out the Dominicans for decades. The Dominicans returned in the 1670s and were able to re-establish several missions in the region. In the late 17th century, the Spanish friars complained of the infidelity of the Manche; that they were quick to adopt Christianity and equally quick to abandon it. Friar Francisco Gallegos complained that trying to concentrate the Manche in mission towns was "like keeping birds in the forest without a cage". Due to the historical links between the Manche Chʼol and the inhabitants of Spanish Cahabón, the Spanish colonial authorities used the Maya inhabitants of Cahabón as guides, interpreters and lay preachers in their attempts to bring the Manche within the empire. By the 1670s the Manche Chʼol were in a difficult position, on the one side forced to bow to Itza trade demands under the threat of armed reprisals, and on the other side forced into extortionate trade with the Spanish encomienda towns. In the late 1670s, Sebastián de Olivera, alcalde mayor (governor) of Verapaz, imposed compulsory trade prices upon the Manche Chʼol, forcing one town to buy 70 machetes at 2.5 times the going price, paid in cacao. Refusal to trade was met with violence, and if the Manche could not afford the price demanded then Olivera's representatives would seize goods, clothing, poultry and previously traded metal tools. In 1684 three Franciscan friars were killed during an attempt to evangelise the inhabitants of Paliac. The three missionaries had been accompanying a Spanish expedition to collect valuable cacao; the expedition is likely to have involved considerable Spanish violence. It is likely that the friars were sacrificed by cutting out their hearts.

Extinction
In 1678 the Manche Chʼol population was devastated by disease; in the area around the town of San Lucas Tzalac it killed every child under six years old and almost all of those under the age of ten. Total deaths, including adults, numbered over 400 and the epidemic prompted all the Manche Chʼol in the affected region to abandon the mission towns and flee into the forest. The Spanish made a number of further attempts to pacify the Manche Chʼol, but these were ultimately unsuccessful, and the Manche Chʼol rebelled in 1689. In that year many Manche Chʼol were forcibly relocated to the Urrán Valley in the highlands, resulting in the abandonment of many of the Manche orchards; this eventually led to the collapse of the regional trade network that by then had been fully linked with colonial Guatemala and supplied it with unknown quantities of cacao.

In 1694, two Franciscan friars set out from Guatemala to see if they could succeed where the Dominicans had failed. Antonio Margil and Melchor López left Cobán in August 1693 to seek out the hostile Lakandon Chʼols in the depths of the rainforest. Antionio Margil had already spent two years among the Manche Chʼol. Although they found the Lakandon, the mission was a failure and the friars were forced to flee. Disappointed by their failure, in April 1694 the friars wrote a letter to the president of the Audiencia Real of Guatemala, Jacinto de Barrios Leal, stating their belief that any further peaceful attempts at converting the Chʼol peoples were pointless, and that the time had come for military action.

The conquering Spanish carried out several operations to relocate the Manche to Alta Verapaz, with their relocation being completed in 1697, a short time after the Spanish finally defeated their Itza Maya neighbours to the northwest. Most of the surviving Manche Chʼol were forcibly resettled in the Guatemalan Highlands, in the villages of El Chol and Belén, in the Urran Valley near Rabinal. The resettled Manche Chʼol suffered from the abrupt change of climate from tropical lowland rain forest to the cold highlands. They were often not provided with suitable clothing by their Spanish overlords, and many died. The depopulation of the Manche and Lakandon Chʼol lands, and the resulting collapse of long-standing trade routes, resulted in the gradual impoverishment of colonial Verapaz.

In 1699 a Spanish expedition under the command of sergeant Martín de Montoya was sent from the Spanish garrison at Nuestra Señora de los Remedios y San Pablo, Laguna del Itza (formerly Nojpetén) to investigate Indian activity in the former Chʼol and Mopan territories. He found evidence that there were still surviving Maya in all the lands he crossed, as evidenced by the carefully tended cacao and vanilla orchards. At this time there were said to be 400 relocated Maya from the same area living in Belén.

By 1710 the population of Manche Chʼol in Belén had fallen to just four; everyone else had died as a result of disease, hunger and melancholy. By 1770 the Manche Chʼol were all but extinct; their original territory had been abandoned and had reverted to wilderness, and the few survivors relocated to the highlands numbered not more than 300 in the whole Urran Valley, where there were almost as many Spanish and ladinos. Many Manche Chʼol in Verapaz were absorbed into the expanding Qʼeqchiʼ Maya population, which gradually occupied the vacated Manche lands. It is possible that a few Manche Chʼol survived in the forested interior of Toledo District in Belize, to be later absorbed by incoming Qʼeqchiʼ in the late 19th century. In the very early part of the 19th century, a handful of Maya were still recorded as speaking Chʼol in Cobán.

Legacy
The highly specialised Manche production methods for annatto, cacao and vanilla were adopted by the incoming Qʼeqchiʼ and are still applied on a small scale. Among the modern-day Qʼeqchiʼ, a tradition still exists that these orchards belong to their ancestors, the chʼolcuink spirits, who lack salt and swap cacao for it.

Notes

References

 
 
  

 

 
 

 

Maya peoples
History of Petén
Former indigenous peoples in Guatemala
Izabal Department
Toledo District
Indigenous peoples in Belize
Spanish conquests in the Americas
Maya Postclassic Period
Maya Contact Period